W17DL-D (channel 68) is a television station licensed to Toa Baja, Puerto Rico. The station serves the entire metropolitan area. The station is owned and operated by TV Red Puerto Rico. The station's transmitter is located at Cerro La Marquesa in Aguas Buenas.

Digital television

The station's digital signal is multiplexed:

References

External links

17DL-D
Low-power television stations in the United States